The Bloc Québécois Shadow Cabinet of the 40th Canadian Parliament is listed below. Modifications were made after Paul Crête's resignation.

Caucus officers

 Leader (Critic to the Prime Minister of Canada): Gilles Duceppe (1997-)
 House Leader and Critic to the Minister responsible for Democratic Reform (Canada): Pierre Paquette (2007-) 
 Deputy House Leader: Christiane Gagnon (2008-)
 Chief Whip: Michel Guimond (2006-)
 Deputy Whip: Claude DeBellefeuille (2008-)
 Bloc Québécois Caucus Chair: Louis Plamondon (2006-)
 Chief organizer and Critic to the Minister of Transport, Infrastructure and Communities: Mario Laframboise (2006-)

Critics for Ministers or Departments

 Minister of Agriculture and Agri-Food: André Bellavance (2006-)
 Minister of Canadian Heritage and Status of Women (Canadian Heritage): Carole Lavallée (2008-)
 Minister of Canadian Heritage and Status of Women (Status of Women): Nicole Demers (2008-)
 Minister of Citizenship and Immigration: Thierry St-Cyr (2008-)
 Minister of the Economic Development Agency of Canada for the Regions of Quebec: Jean-Yves Roy (2008-)
 Minister of the Environment: Bernard Bigras (2000-)
 Minister of Finance: Jean-Yves Laforest (2008-)
 Minister of Fisheries and Oceans: Raynald Blais (2006-)
 Minister of Foreign Affairs: Francine Lalonde (1999-)
 Minister of Health: Luc Malo (2008-)
 Minister of Human Resources and Social Development: Yves Lessard (2004-)
 Minister of Indian Affairs and Northern Development: Marc Lemay (2006-)
 Minister of Industry: Paul Crête (2002-2009), Robert Bouchard (2009-)
 Minister for International Cooperation: Johanne Deschamps (2008-)
 Minister of International Trade: Serge Cardin (2006-)
 Minister of Justice (and Attorney General): Réal Ménard (2006-)
 Minister of Labour: Luc Desnoyers (2008-)
 Minister of National Defence: Claude Bachand (2000-)
 Minister of National Revenue: Robert Carrier (2008-)
 Minister of Natural Resources: Paule Brunelle (2008-)
 Minister of Public Security: Serge Ménard (2006-)
 Minister of Public Works and Government Services: Diane Bourgeois (2008-)
 President of the Queen's Privy Council for Canada and Minister of Intergovernmental Affairs: Jean Dorion (2008-)
 President of the Treasury Board: Richard Nadeau (2006-)
 Minister of Veterans Affairs: Guy André (2008-)

Special responsibilities

 Minister responsible for La Francophonie and Official Languages: Richard Nadeau (2008-)
 Minister for Sport: Pascal-Pierre Paillé (2008-)

Policy areas for which there is no specific minister

 Asia-Pacific: Jean Dorion (2008-)
 Ethics, Access to Information and Privacy: Carole Freeman (2008-)
 Latin America and Africa: Johanne Deschamps (2006-)
 Housing: Christian Ouellet (2006-)
 Public Accounts: Meili Faille (2008-)
 Seniors: Carole Freeman (2008-)
 Youth: Nicolas Dufour (2008-)

See also
Cabinet of Canada
Official Opposition (Canada)
Shadow Cabinet
Official Opposition Shadow Cabinet (Canada)
New Democratic Party Shadow Cabinet

40th Canadian Parliament
Bloc Québécois Shadow Cabinets